is a Japanese comedian who has regular appearances in a number of television shows as well as portraying roles in television drama series. He was born .

He is the boke of OgiYahagi, partnered with Ken Yahagi.

Some younger entertainers such as Bananaman and Teruyuki Tsuchida called him  regardless of whether they are his senior or junior.

Appearances

Regular TV appearances
Music Engine "OgiYahagi Ogi no 37-Sai de gakki Hajimete mimashita!" (Music Air, 2 Oct 2008 –)
Akuma no Keiyaku ni Sign (29 Oct 2008 – 18 Feb 2009, TBS)
Tamori Club (TV Asahi) occasional appearances
AKB48 Nemousu TV Season 4 – (4 Jul 2010 —, Family Gekijo)
Bratto Shitto (7 Jul – 29 Sep 2011, Kansai TV)
OgiYahagi Ogi no Natsuhachi-tō! 80's no Aishi-kata (10 Dec 2011 –, Family Gekijo)
Matsukoi: Ogi no ¥ Dōchū: Moddezzo Yamagata (15 Jul – 30 Sep 2013, Sakuranbo Television)
Kinina Room (6 Sep 2014 –, Dlife)
Chotto Zawatsuku Image Chōsa: Moshikashite Zureteru? (23 Jan – 25 Dec 2017, KTV)

TV dramas
Densha Otoko (Jul–Sep 2005, Fuji TV) – as clerk at restaurant entrance
Nagoya Yomeiri Monogatari (Tōkai TV, Fuji TV)
Unubore Deka Episode 5 "Sweet Tooth" (6 Aug 2010, TBS) – as Yohei Maehara
Uten Chūshi Nine (12 May – 2 Jun 2015, TV Tokyo) – as Ogi
Cook Keibu no Bansan-kai Episode 1 (20 (19 at night) Oct 2016, TBS) – as Hisashi Taguchi

Films
Pyu to Fuku! Jaguar: The Movie (2008) – as Hammer
Project Dream: How to Build Mazinger Z's Hangar (2020)
A Whisker Away (2020) – as Kusugi-sensei

Theatre
Jinjō Ningen Zero (28–30 Mar 2008)

Others
Minna no Keiba (Fuji TV), when the programme was occasionally doubled, there was a case where a live performance was done on a secondary audio channel.
44th Niigata Kinen (31 Aug 2008)
50th American Jockey Club Cup (25 Jan 2009)
46th Niigata Kinen (29 Aug 2010)
57th Allcomer (23 Sep 2012)
Honoo-no Taiiku-kai TV (TBS)
Tetsurō Degawa no Jūden sa sete moraemasen ka? (TV Tokyo)

References

External links
 

Japanese comedians
Japanese television personalities
Comedians from Tokyo
1971 births
Living people